Clepsis laetitiae is a species of moth of the family Tortricidae. It is found in Spain.

The wingspan is 19–22 mm. Adults have been recorded on wing from April to May.

The larvae feed on Vella pseudocitysus sub. pseudocitysus.

Etymology
The species is named for Leticia Soria Ruiz-Ogarrio.

References

Moths described in 1997
Clepsis